Victor Van Schil (21 December 1939 – 30 September 2009) was a Belgian racing cyclist. He rode in 21 Grand Tours in his career, including 11 editions of the Tour de France, four editions of the Vuelta a España, and six editions of the Giro d'Italia.

Career
Van Schil's main victories were two stages of the Vuelta a España, in 1964 and 1968, and the 1968 Brabantse Pijl. He also had success in the 1969 Liège–Bastogne–Liège, finishing alongside his teammate Eddy Merckx, eight minutes ahead of the next rider.

Death
Van Schil committed suicide at his home on September 30, 2009, at age 69, due to suffering from depression.

Major results

1962
 1st Tour du Condroz
 3rd Scheldeprijs
1963
 1st Schaal Sels
1964
 1st Stage 11 Vuelta a España
 2nd Brussels–Ingooigem
 3rd Grand Prix du Midi Libre
 3rd Overall Circuit du Provençal
1965
 3rd Tour du Condroz
 4th Paris–Roubaix
1966
 1st Stage 1a Tour of Belgium
 2nd Liège–Bastogne–Liège
1967
 1st Overall Tour de Wallonie
1968
 1st Stage 13 Vuelta a España
 1st Brabantse Pijl
 3rd Grand Prix Fayt-le-Franc
 3rd Overall Tour de Wallonie
 5th Paris–Roubaix
1969
 1st Stage 4 Vuelta a Mallorca
 2nd Schaal Sels
 2nd Liège–Bastogne–Liège
 2nd Brussels–Ingooigem
1970
 1st Tour du Condroz
 2nd Brabantse Pijl
1972
 1st Tour du Condroz
 2nd Züri-Metzgete
 3rd Grand Prix Monaco
 9th Liège–Bastogne–Liège
1973
 2nd Brabantse Pijl
 2nd Grote Prijs Jef Scherens
 2nd Schaal Sels
1976
 2nd Druivenkoers Overijse

References

External links
 

1939 births
2009 deaths
Belgian male cyclists
Spanish Vuelta a España stage winners
Place of birth missing